Maine Maritime Academy (Maine Maritime or MMA) is a public college focused on maritime training and located in Castine, Maine. The academy was established by the 90th Maine Legislature on March 21, 1941. Unlike federal service academies, a congressional recommendation is not required to attend this state school. Students are not obligated to go to sea or into the military after graduation, and a large portion of the graduating class chooses shore-side employment, often in maritime-related fields or the power generation industry.

Maine Maritime Academy is one of six, non-federal, maritime training colleges in the United States and one of only two that fields a Naval Reserve Officers Training Corps (NROTC) unit. The college is affiliated under the New England Commission of Higher Education.

Academics

The academy offers undergraduate bachelor's degrees through four schools:

The Harold Alfond School of Engineering
The Thompson School of Marine Transportation
The Loeb-Sullivan School of International Business & Logistics
The Corning School of Ocean Studies

The academy also offers interdisciplinary bachelor's degree programs and associate degrees. The academy offers two graduate level programs through the Loeb-Sullivan School of International Business and Logistics.

Maine Maritime Academy has co-op and internship programs. Students from all engineering majors and the Marine Transportation Operations major are required to complete at least one co-op. Some majors are required to complete multiple co-ops. Students in the Regiment of Midshipmen have the opportunity or requirement to participate in two cruises with the Training Ship State of Maine (TSSOM). Students in the Small Vessel Operations major have the opportunity to sail with the schooner Bowdoin on its yearly training cruise.

Notable alumni of Maine Maritime Academy include Kenneth M. Curtis, Chris Caiazzo, Jerald S. Paul, and Thomas K. Shannon.

Athletics
Maine Maritime athletic teams are the Mariners. The academy is a member of the Division III level of the National Collegiate Athletic Association (NCAA), primarily competing in the North Atlantic Conference (NAC) for most of its sports since the 1996–97 academic year; with the football team playing in the New England Women's and Men's Athletic Conference (NEWMAC), and the sailing teams playing in the Division I level of the New England Inter-Collegiate Sailing Association (NEISA).

Maine Maritime competes in 15 intercollegiate varsity sports: Men's sports include basketball, cross country, football, golf, lacrosse, sailing, soccer and swimming & diving; while women's sports include basketball, cross country, lacrosse, sailing, soccer, swimming & diving and volleyball. Club sports include men's & women's wrestling. Currently its football program has been suspended indefinitely due to COVID-19 financial impacts.

Training ships 
The academy has utilized a number of vessels over the years to provide hands-on training and instruction opportunities for cadets at sea, usually former U.S. Navy ships. Each of the academy's training ships bear the same name, TS State of Maine, during their respective time in service as the academy training ship.
 USS Comfort (AH-6) - 1953-1963
 USS Ancon (AGC-4) - 1963-1973
 USNS Upshur (T-AP-198) - 1973-1995
 TS State of Maine (formerly USNS Tanner (T-AGS-40)) - 6 June 1997-present

References

External links
 Official website
 Official athletic website

 
Maritime colleges in the United States
Educational institutions established in 1941
Military academies of the United States
Universities and colleges in Hancock County, Maine
1941 establishments in Maine
Castine, Maine
Public universities and colleges in Maine